This is a list of television programs currently and formerly broadcast by Cartoon Network in Pakistan. The channel was launched on 2 April 2004. This includes shows from Cartoon Network Studios and Warner Bros. Animation.

Current programming 
 Ben 10 (2016)
 Dragon Ball Super
 Grizzy and the Lemmings
 Lamput
 Teen Titans Go!
 The Tom and Jerry Show
 We Bare Bears

Former programming 
 The Amazing World of Gumball
 Apple & Onion
 Archie's Weird Mysteries
 Ben 10 (2005)
 Ben 10 Alien Force 
 Ben 10: Omniverse
 Ben 10: Ultimate Alien
 Chowder
 Courage the Cowardly Dog
 Craig of the Creek
 Dexter's Laboratory
 Dragon Ball Z
 Generator Rex
 Looney Tunes Cartoons
 ¡Mucha Lucha!
 Mr. Bean: The Animated Series
 New Looney Tunes
 Nexo Knights
 Oggy and the Cockroaches
 OK K.O.! Let's Be Heroes
 Power Players
 The Powerpuff Girls
 Powerpuff Girls Z
 Snack World
 Steven Universe Future
 Super Shiro
 Talking Tom & Friends
 ThunderCats
 ThunderCats Roar
 Tom and Jerry Tales
 Victor and Valentino

Programming blocks 
Cartoon Network Popcorn
This block  mostly airs movies from the Tom and Jerry, Scooby Doo, Ben 10, Batman, and Superman franchises along with movies like We Bare Bears: The Movie, Firebreather, and Monster Beach.

Pogo TV
The Pogo block was restarted in January 2021 and only airs Grizzy and the Lemmings. The block was previously aired in 2008 and ended in 2013 featuring more shows. This block is taken from Indian channel Pogo (TV channel).

It's All About Action
A block that featured episodes of Ben 10: Alien Force, Ben 10: Ultimate Alien, and Ben 10: Omniverse.

References 

Cartoon_Network-related_lists